This is a list of 189 species in Macrocentrus, a genus of braconid wasps in the family Braconidae.

Macrocentrus species

 Macrocentrus aegeriae Rohwer, 1915 c g b
 Macrocentrus affinis Muesebeck, 1932 c g
 Macrocentrus albitarsis Granger, 1949 c g
 Macrocentrus alox van Achterberg & Belokobylskij, 1987 c g
 Macrocentrus amphigenes Alexeev, 1971 c g
 Macrocentrus amploventralis He & Chen, 2000 c g
 Macrocentrus ancylivora Rohwer, 1923 c g
 Macrocentrus angustatus (Enderlein, 1920) c g
 Macrocentrus angustifacialis Granger, 1949 c g
 Macrocentrus anjiensis He & Chen, 2000 c g
 Macrocentrus annulicornis Cameron, 1911 c
 Macrocentrus apicalis He & Chen, 2000 c g
 Macrocentrus archipsivorus He & Chen, 2000 c g
 Macrocentrus arcipetiolatus Lou & He, 2000 c g
 Macrocentrus argyroploceus Fischer, 1964 c g
 Macrocentrus asiaticus Belokobylskij, 2000 c g
 Macrocentrus atratus Muesebeck, 1932 c g
 Macrocentrus austrinus He & Chen, 2000 c g
 Macrocentrus baishanzua He & Chen, 2000 c g
 Macrocentrus beijingensis Lou & He, 2000 c g
 Macrocentrus bengtssoni (Fahringer, 1929) c g
 Macrocentrus bicolor Curtis, 1833 c
 Macrocentrus bimaculatus He & Chen, 2000 c g
 Macrocentrus blandoides van Achterberg, 1993 c g
 Macrocentrus blandus Eady & Clark, 1964 c g
 Macrocentrus bradleyi Daniel, 1933 c g
 Macrocentrus brevicaudifer van Achterberg, 1979 c g
 Macrocentrus brevipalpis He & Chen, 2000 c g
 Macrocentrus buolianae Eady & Clark, 1964 c g
 Macrocentrus calacte Nixon, 1938 c g
 Macrocentrus californiensis Ahlstrom, 2005 c g
 Macrocentrus canarsiae Muesebeck, 1932 c g
 Macrocentrus capensis Cameron, 1906 c g
 Macrocentrus carolinensis Watanabe, 1945 c g
 Macrocentrus cerasivoranae Viereck, 1912 c g
 Macrocentrus ceylonicus Enderlein, 1912 c g
 Macrocentrus chasanicus Belokobylskij, 2000 c g
 Macrocentrus choui He & Chen, 2000 c g
 Macrocentrus chui Lou & He, 2000 c g
 Macrocentrus cingulum Brischke, 1882 c g
 Macrocentrus citreitarsis (Enderlein, 1920) c g
 Macrocentrus clypeatus Muesebeck, 1932 c g
 Macrocentrus cnaphalocrocis He & Lou, 1993 c g
 Macrocentrus collaris (Spinola, 1808) c g
 Macrocentrus coloradensis Ahlstrom, 2005 c g
 Macrocentrus concentralis He & Chen, 2000 c g
 Macrocentrus confusstriatus He & Chen, 2000 c g
 Macrocentrus coronarius Lou & He, 2000 c g
 Macrocentrus crambi (Ashmead, 1894) c g
 Macrocentrus crassinervis Nixon, 1950 c g
 Macrocentrus crassipes Muesebeck, 1932 c g
 Macrocentrus crassus Eady & Clark, 1964 c g
 Macrocentrus crocidophorae Muesebeck, 1932 c g
 Macrocentrus cuniculus Walley, 1933 c g
 Macrocentrus dushanensis He & Chen, 2000 c g
 Macrocentrus elongatus Granger, 1949 c g
 Macrocentrus equalis Lyle, 1914 c g
 Macrocentrus exartemae Walley, 1932 c g
 Macrocentrus famelicus (Enderlein, 1920) c g
 Macrocentrus flavomaculatus Lou & He, 2000 c g
 Macrocentrus flavoorbitalis He & Chen, 2000 c g
 Macrocentrus flavus Vollenhoven, 1878 c g
 Macrocentrus fossilipetiolatus Lou & He, 2000 c g
 Macrocentrus fuscicornis Szepligeti, 1914 c g
 Macrocentrus fuscipes Cameron, 1906 c g
 Macrocentrus gibber Eady & Clark, 1964 c g
 Macrocentrus giganteus Granger, 1949 c g
 Macrocentrus gigas Watanabe, 1937 c g
 Macrocentrus glabripleuralis Lou & He, 2000 c g
 Macrocentrus glabritergitus He & Chen, 2000 c g
 Macrocentrus guangxiensis He & Chen, 2000 c g
 Macrocentrus guizhouensis Lou & He, 2000 c g
 Macrocentrus gutianshanensis He & Chen, 2000 c g
 Macrocentrus hangzhouensis He & Chen, 2000 c g
 Macrocentrus hemistriolatus He & Chen, 2000 c g
 Macrocentrus homonae Nixon, 1938 c g
 Macrocentrus huggerti van Achterberg, 1993 c g
 Macrocentrus hunanensis He & Lou, 1992 c g
 Macrocentrus hungaricus Marshall, 1893 c g
 Macrocentrus impressus Muesebeck, 1932 c g
 Macrocentrus incompletus Muesebeck, 1932 c g
 Macrocentrus infirmus (Nees, 1834) c
 Macrocentrus infumatus Muesebeck, 1938 c g
 Macrocentrus infuscatus van Achterberg, 1993 c g
 Macrocentrus innuitorum Walley, 1936 c g
 Macrocentrus instabilis Muesebeck, 1932 c g
 Macrocentrus jacobsoni Szépligeti, 1908 c g
 Macrocentrus karafutus Belokobylskij, 2000 c g
 Macrocentrus kurnakovi Tobias, 1976 c g
 Macrocentrus laevigatus He & Chen, 2000 c g
 Macrocentrus latisulcatus Cameron, 1911 c g
 Macrocentrus linearis (Nees, 1811) c g
 Macrocentrus lishuiensis He & Chen, 2000 c g
 Macrocentrus longicornutus Haeselbarth, 1978 c g
 Macrocentrus longipes Cameron, 1910 c g
 Macrocentrus longistigmus He, 1997 c g
 Macrocentrus luteus Szepligeti, 1911 c g
 Macrocentrus maculistigmus He & Lou, 1992 c g
 Macrocentrus madeirensis van Achterberg, 1993 c g
 Macrocentrus mainlingensis Wang, 1982 c g
 Macrocentrus mandibularis Watanabe, 1967 c g
 Macrocentrus maraisi Nixon, 1956 c g
 Macrocentrus marginator (Nees, 1811) c g
 Macrocentrus marshi Ahlstrom, 2005 c g
 Macrocentrus maximiliani Haeselbarth, 1994 c g
 Macrocentrus melanogaster He & Chen, 2000 c g
 Macrocentrus mellicornis van Achterberg & Belokobylskij, 1987 c g
 Macrocentrus mellipes Provancher, 1880 c g
 Macrocentrus minor Szépligeti, 1908 c g
 Macrocentrus muesebecki Costa Lima, 1950 c g
 Macrocentrus neomexicanus Ahlstrom, 2005 c g
 Macrocentrus nidulator (Nees, 1834) c g
 Macrocentrus nigriceps Szepligeti, 1914 c g
 Macrocentrus nigricoxa He & Chen, 2000 c g
 Macrocentrus nigridorsis Viereck, 1924 c g b
 Macrocentrus nigrigenuis van Achterberg, 1993 c g
 Macrocentrus nigripectus Muesebeck, 1932 c g
 Macrocentrus nigroornatus Cameron, 1911 c g
 Macrocentrus nitidus (Wesmael, 1835) c g
 Macrocentrus nixoni Kurhade & Nikam, 1998 c g
 Macrocentrus nocarus Ahlstrom, 2005 c g
 Macrocentrus novaguineensis Szepligeti, 1902 c g
 Macrocentrus obliquus He & Chen, 2000 c g
 Macrocentrus oculatus Szepligeti, 1914 c g
 Macrocentrus oriens van Achterberg & Belokobylskij, 1987 c g
 Macrocentrus orientalis He & Chen, 2000 c g
 Macrocentrus palliduplus Shenefelt, 1969 c g
 Macrocentrus pallidus Fullaway, 1913 c g
 Macrocentrus pallipes (Nees, 1811) c g
 Macrocentrus pallisteri DeGant, 1930 c g
 Macrocentrus papuanus Strand, 1911 c g
 Macrocentrus parametriatesivorus He & Chen, 2000 c g
 Macrocentrus parki van Achterberg, 1993 c g
 Macrocentrus pectoralis Provancher, 1880 c g
 Macrocentrus peroneae Muesebeck, 1932 c g
 Macrocentrus persephone Nixon, 1950 c g
 Macrocentrus pilosus Watanabe, 1967 c g
 Macrocentrus planitibiae Ahlstrom, 2005 c g
 Macrocentrus postfurcalis Strand, 1911 c g
 Macrocentrus prolificus Wharton, 1984 c g
 Macrocentrus pryeri Song, Cao, Li, Yang & Chen, 2017 g
 Macrocentrus pulchripennis Muesebeck, 1932 c g
 Macrocentrus pyraustae Viereck, 1917 c g
 Macrocentrus qingyuanensis He & Chen, 2000 c g
 Macrocentrus radiellanus He & Chen, 2000 c g
 Macrocentrus resinellae (Linnaeus, 1758) c g
 Macrocentrus reticulatus Muesebeck, 1932 c g
 Macrocentrus retusus van Achterberg & Belokobylskij, 1987 c g
 Macrocentrus rhyacioniae Watanabe, 1970 c g
 Macrocentrus robustus Muesebeck, 1932 c g
 Macrocentrus rossemi Haeselbarth & van Achterberg, 1981 c g
 Macrocentrus rubromaculatus (Cameron, 1901) c g
 Macrocentrus rufotestaceus Cameron, 1906 c g
 Macrocentrus rugifacialis He & Chen, 2000 c g
 Macrocentrus rugulosus Szepligeti, 1914 c g
 Macrocentrus seminiger Muesebeck, 1932 c g
 Macrocentrus sesamivorus van Achterberg, 1996 c g
 Macrocentrus seyrigi Granger, 1949 c g
 Macrocentrus shawi Ahlstrom, 2005 c g
 Macrocentrus sichuanensis He, 1997 c g
 Macrocentrus simingshanus Lou & He, 2000 c g
 Macrocentrus sinensis He & Chen, 2000 c g
 Macrocentrus somaliensis (Szepligeti, 1914) c g
 Macrocentrus soniae Ahlstrom, 2005 c g
 Macrocentrus spilotus van Achterberg & Belokobylskij, 1987 c g
 Macrocentrus sulphureus Szepligeti, 1914 c g
 Macrocentrus suni He & Chen, 2000 c g
 Macrocentrus sylvestrellae van Achterberg, 2001 c g
 Macrocentrus tasmanicus (Wilkinson, 1928) c g
 Macrocentrus tatshinguanus Belokobylskij, 2000 c g
 Macrocentrus terminalis (Ashmead, 1889) c g
 Macrocentrus tessulatanae Hedwig, 1959 c g
 Macrocentrus testaceiceps Szepligeti, 1914 c g
 Macrocentrus theaphilus He & Chen, 2000 c g
 Macrocentrus thoracicus (Nees, 1811) c
 Macrocentrus tianmushanus He & Chen, 2000 c g
 Macrocentrus townesi van Achterberg & Haeselbarth, 1983 c g
 Macrocentrus tricoloratus Turner, 1920 c g
 Macrocentrus trimaculatus (Cameron, 1910) c g
 Macrocentrus tritergitus He & Chen, 2000 c g
 Macrocentrus turkestanicus (Telenga, 1950) c g
 Macrocentrus utilis Muesebeck, 1932 c g
 Macrocentrus vanachterbergi Ahlstrom, 2005 c g
 Macrocentrus wangi He & Chen, 2000 c g
 Macrocentrus watanabei van Achterberg, 1993 c g
 Macrocentrus xingshanensis He, 1997 c g
 Macrocentrus yuanjiangensis He & Chen, 2000 c g
 Macrocentrus zhangi He & Chen, 2000 c g
 Macrocentrus zhejiangensis He & Chen, 2000 c g

Data sources: i = ITIS, c = Catalogue of Life, g = GBIF, b = Bugguide.net

References

Macrocentrus